Sentinel-1A is a European radar imaging satellite launched in 2014. It is the first Sentinel-1 satellite launched as part of the European Union's Copernicus programme.   The satellite carries a C-band Synthetic Aperture Radar which will provide images in all light and weather conditions. It will track many aspects of our environment, from detecting and tracking oil spills and mapping sea ice to monitoring movement in land surfaces and mapping changes in the way land is used.

Program

Copernicus is the long-term European Union Earth observation and monitoring programme under the former name of GMES (Global Monitoring for Environment and Security) and established by a Regulation that entered into force in 2014. It is a user-driven programme under civil control, which will notably encompass the launch of six families of dedicated, EU-owned earth observation satellites and instruments – the so-called Sentinels – and the ramp-up of the 6 Copernicus Services in the fields of atmosphere-, marine- and land-monitoring, climate change, emergency management and security. Copernicus data and services are available on a full, open and free-of charge basis to users, including EU institutions, Member States' authorities, the private sector for the development of commercial downstream applications and services, international partners, the global scientific community, and interested citizens. It provides multi temporal Synthetic Aperture Radar images with a temporal gap of 12 days. Data products can be used for SAR Interferometry  applications. Data downloads can be done through sentinel data hub. Sentinel 2 mission outputs are also available in the same data hub.

Mission history

Pre-launch
Sentinel-1A arrived at its launch site in Kourou, French Guiana on 25 February 2014, ahead of its launch which was at the time planned for 28 March.

Launch
Sentinel-1A was launched on 3 April 2014 by a Soyuz rocket at 21:02:31 GMT (23:02:31 CEST). The first stage separated 118 seconds later, followed by the fairing (209 s), second stage (287 s) and the upper assembly (526 s). After a 617-second burn, the Fregat upper stage delivered Sentinel into a Sun-synchronous orbit at 693 km altitude. The satellite separated from the upper stage 23 min 29 s after liftoff.

Orbital operation
At 09:43  and at 11:21 on 5 April 2014 ACRIMSAT was rated as having a high risk of collision (<20m) with the newly launched Sentinel-1A. A 39-second burn of Sentinel-1A during LEOP successfully avoided the collision.

Preliminary data, taken during commissioning, demonstrated the versatility and capability of the imagery produced by Sentinel-1A even before the radar system is fully calibrated. Mapping sea ice to ensure the safe passage of marine vessels, providing data to validate ice loss models and determining the difference between land used for forest, agriculture and urban areas.

Data became available to all system users on 6 October 2014, marking the beginning of Sentinel-1A operational life.

Copernicus data and services as provided by the Sentinel-satellites and Copernicus services are available on a full, open and free-of-charge basis.

European Data Relay System test 
The satellite was used as part of a in-orbit verification of the ESA European Data Relay System. In 2014, data from the Sentinel-1A satellite in LEO was transmitted via an optical link to the Alphasat in GEO and then relayed to a ground station using a Ka band downlink.

Incidents 
On 31 August 2016, ESA announced they had discovered that a solar panel on the Copernicus Sentinel-1A satellite had been hit by a millimetre-size particle in orbit on 23 August. Thanks to onboard cameras, ground controllers were able to identify the affected area. The satellite's routine operations didn't seem to be altered by the impact.

As of 2200 UTC on 7 September 2016, the JSpOC has identified 5 pieces of small debris in the vicinity of Sentinel-1A (SCC# 39634), which they believe are the result of the small particle impact identified by ESA on 23 August.

References

External links

 
 Sentinel-1 sends back 'selfie' with open arms – ESA image of Sentinel-1A in space after solar panel and radar deployment
 Sentinel-1 at ESA – Sentinel Online
 Sentinel-1 at ESA – Earth Online
 Sentinel-1 at ESA – about us
 Sentinel-1 Scientific Data Hub – ESA
Real-time orbital tracking - uphere.space

Copernicus Programme
Earth observation satellites of the European Space Agency
Space synthetic aperture radar
Spacecraft launched by Soyuz-2 rockets
Spacecraft launched in 2014